Timothy Clarke is a British businessman. He was chief executive officer (CEO) of Mitchells & Butlers from 2003 to 2009.

He was a partner at Panmure Gordon & Co. from 1979 to 1990. From 1992 to 1995, he served as director of Bass European Hotels. He then served as CEO of Six Continents from 1995 to 2000, and of Mitchells & Butlers from 2003 to 2009. He was on the board of directors of Debenhams. He is on the board of directors of Associated British Foods, Hall & Woodhouse, Timothy Taylor Brewery and the British Beer & Pub Association.

He is on the board of trustees of the Birmingham Royal Ballet.

References

Living people
Year of birth missing (living people)
Associated British Foods people
British businesspeople
Mitchells & Butlers